YKY or yky may refer to:

 Kindersley Regional Airport (IATA: YKY), Saskatchewan, Canada
 Yakoma language (ISO 639-3: yky), Democratic Republic of the Congo